The 2009–10 season is Futebol Clube do Porto's 76th season in the Primeira Liga, officially known as the Liga Sagres for sponsorship reasons. Porto won their fourth consecutive title last season and will be aiming to match their national record of winning five titles in a row. They are also the current Taça de Portugal holders after defeating Paços de Ferreira 1–0 last season at the Estádio do Jamor.

Club

Technical staff

Medical Staff

Board of Directors 

 Kit 

|
|
|
|

Other information

Squad

Players 
As of 3 February 2009.

 Transfers 

 In 

Total spending:  €24,900,000

 Out 

Total income:  €74,550,000

 Loan out 

 Statistics 

 Squad statistics Last updated on 22 February 2010.|}

 Top scorers Last updated on 22 February Disciplinary record Last updated on 22 February Start formations 

 Starting 11 

 Pre-season 

 Fixtures 

 Peace Cup 
Group D

Semi-final

 Overall 

 Supertaça Cândido de Oliveira 

 Primeira Liga 

 Table 

 Results 
Summary

By Round

 Matches 

 UEFA Champions League 

 Group stage 

 First knockout round 

 First leg 

 Second leg Arsenal advances 6–2 on aggregate.''

Taça de Portugal

Third round

Fourth round

Fifth round

Quarter-finals

Semi-finals

First leg

Second leg

Taça da Liga

Third round

Semi-final

Final

External links 
 FC Porto official website
 UEFA Champions League
 Portal dos Dragões
 Social networking for FC Porto fans
 FCPorto-videos.net

2009-10
Portuguese football clubs 2009–10 season